Amiina (formerly Amína, stylized in lowercase) is an Icelandic band composed of members 
Maria Huld Markan Sigfúsdóttir, and Sólrún Sumarliðadóttir, Magnús Trygvason Eliassen and Guðmundur Vignir Karlsson. In the past they have frequently performed live and in the studio with Sigur Rós.

Their music is made with a great number of instruments. It contains elements of minimalistic style, contemporary classical, ambient, and electronic loops. In their performances each member will play many instruments, sometimes moving across the stage, going from one instrument to another mid-song.

History
The founding members Maria Huld Markan Sigfúsdóttir (born September 29, 1980), Sólrún Sumarliðadóttir (born August 10, 1977), Hildur Ársælsdóttir (born January 31, 1980) and Edda Rún Ólafsdóttir (born February 3, 1978) performed as a quartet playing classical music when they were studying string instruments at the Reykjavík College of Music in the late 1990s. María and Hildur as violinists, Edda as violist, and Sólrún as cellist. Later on they adopted the name amiina and increasingly moved on to play all sorts of music with various bands in Reykjavík.

In 1999 the quartet joined Icelandic band Sigur Rós on-stage. The collaboration has continued ever since, with amiina contributing strings to Sigur Rós' music on tour and in the recording studio notably on the award-winning album as well as its follow-up, Takk...., and Með suð í eyrum við spilum endalaust. amiina recorded strings for the Sigur Rós album Valtari but no longer accompany Sigur Rós on tour.

Their first commercially available recording was the four-track EP animamina. This was followed by their first single, Seoul. Their first full-length album, Kurr, was released March 21, 2007, through the band's own label, Bláskjár. It was re-released by Ever Records in June 2007.

amiina's first solo tours of Europe and America were in October and November 2006. Following the release of Kurr in 2007 they toured North America in March and April and Europe in May. The song "Hilli" was released on December 10, 2007, as the second single from the album Kurr. It is a collaboration between amiina and Lee Hazlewood whose vocals (the last recording before his death) were mixed with a reworked version of the original song.

amiina appeared in the 2008 Icelandic movie Brúðguminn (White Night Wedding).

In the autumn of 2007, drummer Magnús Trygvason Eliassen (born November 18, 1985) joined amiina on tour, 
adding percussion to the band's textures. A few months later, collaboration between amiina and the electronic artist Guðmundur Vignir Karlsson (born November 10, 1978) under the moniker Kippi Kaninus was initiated while preparing a show for the Reykjavík Arts Festival. The merging of Kippi Kaninus' electronics and rhythms with amiina's sounds and Magnús' percussion became the starting point for more established collaboration between the six musicians. During 2009 Magnús and Guðmundur joined the group on a permanent basis.

The recording of amiina's second studio album Puzzle started during spring or summer of 2010, released by the band on September 27, 2010, getting worldwide distribution the following year. The songs on Puzzle are more rhythmically rugged than previous work and feature heavier use of electronics. amiina's long-standing fondness for light melodies and open-minded instrumentation, however, continued.

In 2009 amiina started to perform their original soundtracks to pioneering German filmmaker Lotte Reiniger's 1930s silhouette animations of the timeless fairy tales Sleeping Beauty, Cinderella and Aladdin. The so-called Animagica program, originally performed at the Branchage Film Festival in Jersey, has now been performed at Latitude, Sydney Festival, Mona Foma in Tasmania, St. Leonard's Church London, Perth International Art Festival, National Museum of Singapore and Reykjavik's Children Festival. When performing the Animagica program amiina plays usually as a trio or a quartet.

In late 2012 amiina recorded The Lighthouse Project. It was a work which the band started in 2009 and was released as an EP in June 2013, distributed by Morr Music. These songs were recorded in their original arrangements for a quartet. Because the group felt it important to convey the intimacy of the original performances it was recorded "live" in the studio by Ben Frost.

In between work with amiina the band members have kept themselves busy, recording or touring with other artists such as: Sigur Rós, Yann Tiersen, Spiritualized, Efterklang, Yukihiro Takahasi, Canon Blue, Pétur Ben, Ben Frost, Tilbury, Borko, múm, Jónsi & Alex, Kippi Kaninus, adhd, Moses Hightower, Sin Fang, and Zoon van snooK.

During 2015 Hildur Ársælsdóttir and Edda Rún Ólafsdóttir left the band. On November 25, 2016, amiina returned as a four-member band releasing their album Fantômas. Their upcoming album Pharology is planned for June 25, 2021 and is expected as a digital and vinyl release.

Instruments
Electronic
Compact synthesizer
Digital piano
Theremin
Guitars
Baroque
Solid-body electric
Harps
Celtic
Reeds
Harmonium
Melodica
Metallophones
Celesta
Glockenspiel (which they sometimes bow)
Viols
Cello
Viola
Violin
Zithers
Gideon harp (external description; also called a "table harp")
Other
Call bells (also called "office" or "reception" bells)
Glass harp
Kalimba
Mandolin
Musical saw

Discography

Albums
Kurr (March 21, 2007)
Puzzle (September, 2010)
Fantômas (November 25, 2016)

EPs
AnimaminA (May 9, 2005)
Re Minore (2009)
The Lighthouse Project (June 7, 2013)

Singles
"Seoul" (November 6, 2006)
"Hilli (At The Top Of The World)" (December 17, 2007) [7" limited edition]
"Over & Again" (2010) [Limited to 500 copies]
"What are we waiting for?" (September 2010)

Compilation inclusions
Screaming Masterpiece (2005)
Kitchen Motors Family Album/Fjölskyldualbúm Tilraunaeldhússins (Spring 2006)
Nightmare Revisited ("Doctor Finkelstein/In the Forest") (2008)

References

External links 

 
 Amiina at NPR Music
 Amiina entry at The Indie Music Database
 2011 interview with Amiina

Sigur Rós
Icelandic post-rock groups
All-female bands
String quartets
Musical groups from Reykjavík